

Acts of the Northern Ireland Assembly

|-
| {{|Inquiry into Historical Institutional Abuse Act (Northern Ireland) 2013|ania|2|18-01-2013|maintained=y|archived=n|An Act to make provision relating to an inquiry into institutional abuse between 1922 and 1995.}}
|-
| {{|Charities Act (Northern Ireland) 2013|ania|3|18-01-2013|maintained=y|archived=n|An Act to amend the Charities Act (Northern Ireland) 2008; to transfer certain functions of the Department for Social Development to the Charity Commission for Northern Ireland; and for connected purposes.}}
|-
| {{|Budget Act (Northern Ireland) 2013|ania|4|14-03-2013|maintained=y|archived=n|An Act to authorise the issue out of the Consolidated Fund of certain sums for the service of the years ending 31st March 2013 and 2014; to appropriate those sums for specified purposes; to authorise the Department of Finance and Personnel to borrow on the credit of the appropriated sums; to authorise the use for the public service of certain resources for the years ending 31st March 2013 and 2014; and to revise the limits on the use of certain accruing resources in the year ending 31st March 2013.}}
|-
| {{|Business Improvement Districts Act (Northern Ireland) 2013|ania|5|21-03-2013|maintained=y|archived=n|An Act to make provision for business improvement districts and for connected purposes.}}
|-
| {{|Water and Sewerage Services (Amendment) Act (Northern Ireland) 2013|ania|6|25-04-2013|maintained=y|archived=n|An Act to enable the Department for Regional Development to continue to make payments to water and sewerage undertakers for a limited period; and to make provision requiring certain notices to be registered in the Statutory Charges Register.}}
|-
| {{|Criminal Justice Act (Northern Ireland) 2013|ania|7|25-04-2013|maintained=y|archived=n|An Act to amend the law relating to sex offender notification, sexual offences prevention orders and human trafficking; to provide for the destruction, retention, use and other regulation of certain fingerprints and DNA samples and profiles; to provide for the release on licence of persons detained under Article 45(2) of the Criminal Justice (Children) (Northern Ireland) Order 1998; to amend Article 21BA of the Criminal Evidence (Northern Ireland) Order 1999; to abolish the common law offence of scandalising the judiciary; and to permit criminal proceedings on Sunday at certain times.}}
|-
| {{|Civil Service (Special Advisers) Act (Northern Ireland) 2013|ania|8|08-07-2013|maintained=y|archived=n|An Act to amend the law on special advisers in the Northern Ireland Civil Service.}}
|-
| {{|Budget (No. 2) Act (Northern Ireland) 2013|ania|9|18-07-2013|maintained=y|archived=n|An Act to authorise the issue out of the Consolidated Fund of certain sums for the service of the year ending 31st March 2014; to appropriate those sums for specified purposes; to authorise the Department of Finance and Personnel to borrow on the credit of the appropriated sums; to authorise the use for the public service of certain resources (including accruing resources) for the year ending 31st March 2014; and to repeal certain spent provisions.}}
|-
| {{|Marine Act (Northern Ireland) 2013|ania|10|17-09-2013|maintained=y|archived=n|An Act to provide for marine plans in relation to the Northern Ireland inshore region; to provide for marine conservation zones in that region; to make further provision in relation to marine licensing for certain electricity works in that region; and for connected purposes.}}
}}

References

2013